Kanehiro (written:  or ) is a masculine Japanese given name. Notable people with the name include:

, Japanese physician
, Japanese kugyō

Japanese masculine given names